The Hålogaland Bridge is a suspension bridge which crosses the Rombaksfjorden in Narvik Municipality in Nordland county, Norway. It is the second-longest bridge span in Norway. The bridge is part of the European Route E6 highway. The bridge cost . Financing came from a mix of state grants and tolls.

The bridge lies above the Arctic Circle and is the longest suspension bridge within the Arctic Circle at the time of its construction.  Construction of the bridge was featured on Season 1 Episode 4 of the Science Channel show Building Giants, titled Arctic Mega Bridge.  Another suspension bridge, the Rombak Bridge, is nearby further-east through the fjord.

Construction began on February 18, 2013 and was completed in 2018. The inauguration ceremony was held on December 9, 2018, and the bridge was opened to traffic that same day.

History
The bridge was originally planned to be either a suspension bridge or a symphony bridge (a combination of a suspension bridge, a cable-stayed bridge and a cantilever bridge) but the latter was dropped in 2008, as it would cost  more. The bridge had an inauguration ceremony on 9 December 2018 and was opened for traffic the same day.

Financing
As part of the comprehensive financing of the bridge, Narvik Airport, Framnes would be closed (it closed 1 April 2017, one year before the opening). The bridge shortens travel time to Harstad/Narvik Airport, Evenes from 60 to 40 minutes, and local politicians have accepted the deal. In October 2009, State Secretary Erik Lahnstein stated that he was not happy with the calculations, as they were based on unrealistic presumptions. In September 2010, Minister of Transport and Communications Magnhild Meltveit Kleppa stated that the state would issue a grant of "several hundred million kroner". On 25 May 2012, Kleppa announced that the government would grant  for the bridge, which would supplement  in tolls and a minor amount from Narvik Municipality. A toll station with a  toll was opened in September 2015 along the old road, and a toll station with  toll was opened on the north access road after the bridge opened.

Construction
The construction start was 18 February 2013 and was built by a Chinese company Sichuan Road and Bridge Group. Expected opening was the spring of 2018, although due to various delays, it was finally opened for traffic on 9 December 2018.

The project comprised:
 The Hålogaland Bridge, 
 The Ornes tunnel, on the Narvik side
 The Storlikoll tunnel, at Øyjord
 The Trældal tunnel,

References

Narvik
Road bridges in Nordland
Suspension bridges in Norway
Roads within the Arctic Circle
European route E6 in Norway
Bridges completed in 2018